Super Air Jet is an Indonesian airline headquartered in Jakarta and based at Soekarno–Hatta International Airport. The airline was founded in March 2021 and commenced operations on August 6, 2021.

History 

Super Air Jet was formally launched in March 2021, and is financed by Lion Air Group founder, Rusdi Kirana. The airline obtained its Air Operator's Certificate from the Indonesian Ministry of Transportation on 30 June 2021 and will be launching the same year to 11 destinations in Indonesia. The airline is headed by Ari Azhari, who once served as the General Manager of Services for the Lion Air Group. Despite the airline's close connections to the Lion Air Group, its official channels has rejected claims of any formal ties to Lion Air and its subsidiaries.

The airline adopts a low-cost carrier model that focuses on point to point journeys to transport passengers between islands in Indonesia. It focuses on millennials as a target market. The airline will launch its services with six maiden routes from Jakarta to Batam, Medan, Padang, Palembang, Pekanbaru, and Pontianak.

Super Air Jet launched flights with three used Airbus A320-200s which formerly flew for India's Indigo and Tigerair Australia. The airline officially commenced operations on 6 August 2021 with a flight from Jakarta to Medan and Batam, following a month long delay due to the Indonesian Community Activities Restrictions Enforcement.

Destinations 

As of September 2022, the airline currently serves 25 destinations from its base at Jakarta's Soekarno-Hatta International Airport in Cengkareng.

Fleet 

As of January 2023, Super Air Jet's fleet consists of the following aircraft:

See also 

 Airlines of Indonesia
 Batik Air
 Lion Air Group
 Lion Air

References

External links 
 Official website

Airlines of Indonesia
Airlines established in 2021
Airlines of Asia
Lion Air
Companies based in Jakarta
Indonesian brands